Abbingdon Music Research (AMR) is one of the UK's largest manufacturers of high-end audio systems. While most of their acclaim has come from their amplifiers and CD players  (their flagship being the Reference Series System with a price of roughly $100K), they also make phono pre-amplifiers, loudspeakers, cables and accessories.

Founded in 2000, AMR is based in London, United Kingdom. It is a subsidiary of the Abbingdon Global Group.

History 

March 2000 – AMR was formed and design work first commenced on the CD-77.

iFi Audio 
iFi Audio is a subsidiary of AMR that manufactures high-end audio products: amplifiers, Active Buffer/Preamplifiers, DACs and USB filters.

See also
 List of phonograph manufacturers

References

External links 
AMR UK website

Audio amplifier manufacturers
Compact Disc player manufacturers
Audio equipment manufacturers of the United Kingdom
Manufacturing companies based in London
Loudspeaker manufacturers
Phonograph manufacturers